The 2021 Men's NORCECA Volleyball Championship was the 27th edition of the tournament, and was held in Durango City, Mexico from 18 to 23 August 2021. The first and second places qualified to the 2022 FIVB Volleyball Men's World Championship.

Squads

Venue
 Auditorio del Pueblo, Durango City, Mexico

Pool standing procedure
 Number of matches won
 Match points
 Points ratio
 Sets ratio
 Result of the last match between the tied teams

Match won 3–0: 5 match points for the winner, 0 match points for the loser
Match won 3–1: 4 match points for the winner, 1 match point for the loser
Match won 3–2: 3 match points for the winner, 2 match points for the loser

Preliminary round
All times are Central Daylight Time (UTC−05:00).

Pool A

Pool B

Final round
All times are Central Daylight Time (UTC−05:00).

Quarterfinals

5th–8th semifinals

Semifinals

7th place match

5th place match

3rd place match

Final

Final standing

Awards

Most Valuable Player
 Arturo Iglesias
Best Scorer
 Henry Tapia
Best Server
 Josué De Jesús López
Best Digger
 Dennis Del Valle
Best Receiver
 Carlos López
Best Setter
 Pedro Rangel
Best Outside Spikers
 Miguel Ángel López
 Brandon Koppers
Best Middle Blockers
 José Israel Masso
 Dawilin Ramill Méndez
Best Opposite Spiker
 Henry Tapia
Best Libero
 Dennis Del Valle

See also
2021 Women's NORCECA Volleyball Championship

References

External links
Official website

Men's NORCECA Volleyball Championship
NORCECA
International volleyball competitions hosted by Mexico
2021 in Mexican sports
NORCECA